The Harvard Surgical Unit (sometimes called the Harvard Medical Unit) was a volunteer contingent of medical personnel from Harvard University and Massachusetts General Hospital who provided medical assistance to the British Expeditionary Force in Europe during World War I.  It was organized in June 1915 and was demobilized in January 1919. It operated General Hospital No. 22 of the Royal Army Medical Corps, located in Camiers, France.

References 

Expatriate military units and formations
Harvard University
Military units and formations established in 1915
Military units and formations disestablished in 1919